Sikh Federation may refer to any of a number of organisations related to Sikhism:

 All India Sikh Students Federation
 International Sikh Youth Federation
 Sehajdhari Sikh Federation (India)
 Sikh Federation (UK)

Sikh politics